Goodwin Procter LLP is a global law firm. It is one of the largest law firms in the world as measured by revenue and consists of more than 1,800 lawyers across offices in Boston, Cambridge, Frankfurt, Munich, Hong Kong, London, Los Angeles, Luxembourg, New York City, Paris, Philadelphia, Santa Monica, Silicon Valley, San Francisco, Singapore, and Washington, D.C. Goodwin focuses on complex transactional work, high-stakes litigation and advisory services in matters involving financial institutions, intellectual property, private equity, real estate capital markets, securities litigation, white collar defense, technology and life sciences.

Goodwin currently has over 2,800 employees worldwide, representing a nearly 30% increase in lawyers and staff since January 2021, and more than a 60% increase overall since 2017. This growth has been mirrored by the firm’s rising revenues, which increased from $1.33 billion in 2019 to $1.49 billion in 2020, and reaching $1.97 billion in 2021. Between 2010 and 2021, Goodwin’s annual revenue nearly tripled.

The firm is particularly known for advising high-growth businesses in the technology, life sciences and real estate sectors, as well as the private equity and venture capital investors that finance them. The firm sits “at the top in the tech and capital arena,” and is “a known entity, and frequent adviser, to Silicon Valley’s entrepreneurs.” Goodwin’s transactional lawyers represent public and private companies across their entire lifecycles, including financings, capital market transactions, mergers and acquisitions, collaborations and licensing, intellectual property and regulatory matters. The firm’s litigation lawyers assist clients in a wide range of industries, with particular expertise in consumer financial services, intellectual property, white collar defense, securities, commercial and business litigation, appellate litigation, products litigation and counseling, labor and employment, ERISA litigation and antitrust.

In 2018, Goodwin became one of the first major law firms to launch a dedicated proptech practice to serve the growing real estate technology industry. The firm also has practices dedicated to the fintech industry as well as digital currency and blockchain, and claims it represents about 40 percent of the companies on the Forbes Fintech 50 list.  

Goodwin has been named “Biotech Firm of the Year” by U.S. News & World Report - Best Lawyers seven times, Life Sciences and Intellectual Property "Practice Groups Of The Year" by Law360, "IP Law Firm of the Year" and "US Life Cycle Firm Of The Year" by LMG Life Sciences. The firm also ranked first in Refinitiv’s full-year 2021 league tables for global M&A by deal count. Goodwin has also been recognized as a “Best Place to Work for LGBTQ Equality” by the Human Rights Campaign for nine consecutive years, and the firm has been included on Seramount’s annual list of “Best Law Firms for Women” 11 times.

History

In 1912, lawyers and former Harvard classmates Robert Eliot Goodwin and Joseph Osborne Procter, Jr. ran into each other on the street and decided to start their own law firm, Goodwin & Procter, which opened its offices on July 1 that year at 84 State Street in Boston. That winter, Robert Goodwin and Amos Taylor represented Mary Newell against the Oceanic Steam Navigation Company for the sum of $110,400 resulting from the April 15, 1912 sinking of the RMS Titanic. Another case taken on in the firm's early days stemmed from the infamous pyramid scheme orchestrated in Boston by Charles Ponzi. After the scheme was exposed as fraud, Robert Goodwin served as the bankruptcy referee for Middlesex County amid thousands of recovery claims in the bankruptcy courts. When the United States joined the allied cause in World War I in 1917, Robert Goodwin joined the country's vanguard deployment in France, eventually rising to the rank of colonel and assuming command of the 101st Field Artillery. After the campaign, he was awarded the Distinguished Service Medal. Not long after, Samuel Hoar V, a litigator, was hired, followed by Fred Tarbell Field, a well-respected tax lawyer who was a friend of Procter's, and the firm became known as Goodwin, Procter, Field & Hoar. In early 1929, Field was appointed a justice of the Supreme Judicial Court of Massachusetts (and would later become its Chief Justice), and the firm was renamed Goodwin, Procter & Hoar, a name it would retain for the next 72 years.
The Depression years proved pivotal for the firm's future diversification and growth. Liquidation cases, including the unwinding of the Boston Continental Bank, provided a surge of business, as did the proliferation of federal agencies and regulations brought on by the New Deal. Around the same time, Greater Boston's manufacturing and maritime industries faded and the financial management industry expanded, presenting new opportunities for work on highly complex financial transactions.

Goodwin Procter also undertook matters involving public service and public policy, including public investigations of corruption and malfeasance, as well as cases with constitutional overtones. When the Massachusetts governor pardoned New England Mafia boss Raymond Patriarca in 1938, the resulting public furor led the Legislature to establish a commission to investigate the state's pardon and parole procedures. Sam Hoar, with Don Hurley as his lieutenant, headed the commission, whose resulting investigation led to reform of the pardon laws and impeachment of a member of the Governor's Council. More than 70 years later, the Commonwealth would once again call on Goodwin Procter lawyers to examine alleged corruption in the state's parole office.

After World War II, partners Leonard Wheeler and Frank Wallis played instrumental roles in the historic Nuremberg Trials, presenting much of the Americans' case against the Nazis. "It was a most amazing and thrilling experience," recalled Wallis. "I was speaking to the world - not only the world of today but the world of future generations." Post-war practice would not be business as usual as the firm reached a generational turning point, with Robert Goodwin entering semi-retirement and Sam Hoar's passing in 1952. (Joe Procter had died earlier in 1932.) Goodwin formally retired in 1963, ending a 60-year legal career; he died in 1971.

In 1960, tax partners Allan Higgins and Charlie Post helped draft and secure passage of the Real Estate Investment Trust Act, which was hailed as a significant catalyst for real estate development across the country. In 1963, partner Don Hurley played a role in conceiving, drafting and securing passage of an amendment to the Bank Holding Company Act exempting parent companies of single banks and non-banking subsidiaries from federal restrictions on commercial banks.

In 1969, after more than a half-century in the India Building at 84 State Street, the firm moved to a new office tower at 28 State, where it would remain for 16 years before moving to Exchange Place at 53 State Street in 1985. To celebrate its 75th anniversary in 1987, the firm made a donation of $1 million to the City of Boston to fund initiatives in public education. The donation, called SEED (Support for Early Educational Development), was made up entirely of individual contributions by the firm's partners.

With 280 lawyers, Goodwin Procter entered the 1990s as the “largest law firm under one roof in the country,” according to Massachusetts Lawyers Weekly. The firm made its first foray outside Boston in 1994 with an office in Washington, D.C., followed by one in New York in 1997. The acquisition of 27 lawyers from a northern New Jersey firm and 13 litigators from a New York products liability shop bolstered the firm's IP and litigation practices in New York.

In 1998, Regina Pisa became the first woman to be named Chairman and Managing Partner of an AmLaw 100 firm. Under Pisa's leadership, Goodwin grew from 300 lawyers primarily in Boston to more than 900 lawyers serving clients from eight locations in the United States, Europe and Asia. In 2004, the firm merged with the Washington, D.C.-based litigation and regulatory mid-sized firm Shea & Gardner. The following year over 60 attorneys from Testa, Hurwitz & Thibeault joined Goodwin Procter as Testa Hurwitz dissolved, a move the Boston Globe called possibly "the biggest coup in Boston legal history." Goodwin first established its West Coast presence in 2006, opening offices in Los Angeles and San Francisco. It  launched its Silicon Valley presence in 2007. The firm went global in 2008 with offices in London (Goodwin's first European location) and Hong Kong.

At its century mark in 2012, Goodwin had 850 lawyers and another 720 professional staff serving clients from offices in the United States, Europe and Asia. As part of its centennial celebrations, the firm started its Annual Days of Service tradition, during which employees in each office give back to their communities. In 2015, Goodwin announced the opening of an office in Frankfurt, Germany. In April 2016, Goodwin opened its third European office in Paris, France. Later that year, the firm moved its Boston home to 100 Northern Avenue in the city's Seaport District after more than 100 years at the corner of State and Congress Streets. Two years later, Goodwin announced a significant expansion of its European Private Equity and Private Investment Funds practices with a group comprising the bulk of the market-leading and former SJ Berwin investment funds team. In 2019, Goodwin opened new offices in Santa Monica, Luxembourg and Cambridge. In April 2022, Goodwin continued expanding its European operations by opening a second German office in Munich. Goodwin's Singapore office, opened in October 2022, marked the firm's second location in Asia.

Rankings and Reputation

Goodwin has been consistently ranked as one of the most prestigious law firms in the United States and globally. The firm ranks 17th on the American Lawyer’s annual ranking of U.S. law firms by gross revenue, and its lawyers and practice groups are consistently recognized by Chambers, U.S. News & World Report and Legal 500.

Among others, recent recognition includes:

2022
 Goodwin earned the top position among law firms in Refinitiv’s H1 league tables for global M&A by deal count
 Goodwin was recognized by Mergermarket as the top law firm by deal count for Global M&A, UK M&A, U.S. M&A, Global Buyouts, U.S. Buyouts and European Buyouts
 The Human Rights Campaign Foundation named Goodwin a ‘Best Place to Work for LGBTQ+ Equality’
 Seramount recognized Goodwin as a Best Law Firm for Women

2021
 Goodwin achieved Diversity Lab’s Mansfield 4.0 Certification after completing a twelve-month certification program
 The American Lawyer Industry Awards named Moderna and Goodwin the Best Client-Law Firm Team
 Private Equity Magazine selected Goodwin as the Law Firm of the Year in France
 The Asia Legal Awards named Goodwin the 2021 M&A firm of the year for mid-sized deals

2020
 The British Legal Awards named Goodwin the 2020 Life Sciences Team of the Year
 Chambers USA 2020 selected Goodwin as the only law firm to receive top-tier nationwide rankings for both Mid-Market Private Equity Buyouts and Startups & Emerging Companies work
 Goodwin was recognized by National Law Journal’s Appellate Hot List
 Goodwin was named a U.S. Life Cycle firm by LMG Life Sciences for the ninth consecutive year

2019

 Forbes named Goodwin one of America’s Top Trusted Corporate Law Firms, recommending the firm’s Private Equity and Venture Capital practice areas
 Goodwin ranked sixth among the world's best law firms to work for, according to an American Lawyer survey of 2019 summer associates 
 The Legal 500 UK Awards selected Goodwin as the Investment Fund Formation and Management Firm of the Year 
 Goodwin was named “Law Firm of the Year” for Mass Tort Litigation / Class Actions – Defendants by U.S. News – Best Lawyers 

 Human Rights Campaign recognized Goodwin as a Best Place to Work for LGBTQ Equality 
 Mergers & Acquisitions magazine named Goodwin M&A Mid-Market Law Firm of the Year 
 India Business Law Journal named Goodwin a Key Player in India for the 11th consecutive year

2018

 BTI Consulting Group ranked Goodwin among 30 best law firms for client service 
 U.S. News & World Report – Best Lawyers named Goodwin Real Estate Law Firm of the Year 
 Working Mother magazine named Goodwin one of Best Law Firms for Women for the ninth consecutive year

2017

 M&A Atlas Awards named Goodwin Outstanding U.S. Private Equity Law Firm of the Year 
 Goodwin was named IP Firm of the Year at LMG Life Sciences Awards 
 Law360 named Goodwin's Life Sciences and Intellectual Property practices Practice Groups of the Year, with the latter practice earning that recognition for the third consecutive year

Diversity, Equity & Inclusion
Goodwin has its own diversity, equity and inclusion (DEI) team that supports the firm’s DEI-related initiatives and goals. According to Goodwin, diversity, equity and inclusion are core values that drive its approach to the business and practice of law. Firm-wide initiatives that were created to raise awareness, support DEI competencies and create space for connection within the workplace include:

Confronting Anti-Black Racism — in 2021, Goodwin launched its Black Anti-Racism Task Force. The task force is composed of Goodwin's senior management and Black leaders, including partners, associates and global operations team members. The task force works to address anti-Black racism in the legal industry and in Goodwin's communities, and examines the firm's global systems, processes and practices to improve the experience and career trajectories of Goodwin's Black lawyers and global operation team members.

Inclusive Leadership Training — Goodwin conducts inclusive leadership training as a part of its strategy to build a more inclusive community within the firm. These trainings are implemented throughout the employee lifecycle, from recruiting to onboarding to performance reviews. Additionally, each senior DEI leader works with legal practice group leaders to curate a DEI strategy specific to their circumstances while still remaining aligned with firm-wide efforts.

AllVoices — In December 2021, Goodwin partnered with and launched AllVoices – a platform where employees and partners can ask questions, voice concerns around topics such as inclusion, workplace respect, or company culture, report microaggressions, provide feedback or communicate directly with Goodwin’s senior DEI and HR Talent teams anonymously. 

Social Justice Advocacy — Goodwin engages in pro bono opportunities related to social justice advocacy through organizations like the Law Firm Anti-Racism Alliance, the Last Prisoner Project and Lawyers for Good Government. The firm’s docket includes many asylum and naturalization cases and clinics, including VAWA. Moreover, one of Goodwin’s most popular projects at the firm is the Transgender Name Change Project in partnership with GLAD. 

In January 2020, Goodwin announced public retention and advancement goals to be achieved in the next five years as a key next step in the firm’s diversity, equity and inclusion journey. By January 2025:
The diversity of (i) Goodwin’s senior associate population and (ii) its population of partners and equity partners elevated in the preceding five years will match or exceed its entry-level associate diversity, which is 50% gender diverse, 35% racioethnically diverse, and 10% LGBTQ+ diverse
The collective composition of all firm leadership committees will be at least 40% diverse

Neighborhood Business Initiative
Goodwin’s signature pro bono program, the Neighbourhood Business Initiative (NBI), is a program founded and run by Goodwin to bring business and legal services to entrepreneurs and small-business owners who are members of historically excluded communities, or whose businesses positively impact these communities, in Greater Boston, New York and California. The Initiative's primary activities are to provide, on a pro bono basis, legal resources, workshops and clinics, as well as one-on-one direct pro bono representation. NBI recently celebrated its 20th anniversary in 2021.

More than 1,000 Goodwin professionals have devoted 40,000+ hours to provide business-related pro bono legal services to hundreds of small business clients nationwide. Goodwin dedicates 3% to 5% of its annual hours to pro bono representation and serves over 1,000 clients each year.

Founders Workbench

In 2010, Goodwin launched Founders Workbench, a first-of-its-kind open source legal advisory resource designed to help entrepreneurs navigate the legal and organizational challenges faced by startups and emerging businesses, with free start-up document creation capability. In March 2013, Goodwin launched an updated version of Founders Workbench, which now included legal documents for establishing Limited Liability Companies (LLCs) and introduced new web mobile apps for managing finances and understanding relevant legal and business terms. The site has been recognized by the Legal Marketing Association, InformationWeek, and CIO.

See also
List of largest United States-based law firms by profits per partner

References

External links
Official website
Founders Workbench
Big Molecule Watch
Consumer Finance Enforcement Watch
LenderLaw Watch
Digital Currency Perspectives

Law firms based in Boston
Intellectual property law firms
Biopharmaceutical law firms
Law firms established in 1912
1912 establishments in Massachusetts